Misere Mortem is the debut studio album by the Norwegian gothic metal band Mortemia.
The design was done by the agency angst-im-wald.

Track listing

Personnel
 Morten Veland - vocals, guitars, bass, keyboards, drum programming, producer

Additional personnel and staff
 Damien Surian - choir vocals
 Mathieu Landry - choir vocals
 Emmanuelle Zoldan - choir vocals
 Sandrine Gouttebel - choir vocals
 Mika Jussila - mastering

References

2010 debut albums
Napalm Records albums